Thomas Carter may refer to:

Entertainment
 Charles Thomas Carter (c. 1735–1804), Irish composer
 Thomas Carter (composer) (1769–1800), Irish composer
 Thomas Carter (director) (born 1953), American actor and film director

Politics
Thomas Carter (died 1726) (1650–1726), Irish politician, MP for Fethard and Portarlington
Thomas Carter (1690–1763), Irish politician, MP for Trim, Hillsborough, Dungarvan, and Lismore
Thomas Carter (Hull MP) (–1767), English politician, MP for Kingston upon Hull 1747–1754
Thomas Carter (Old Leighlin MP) (1720–1765), Irish politician,  MP for Old Leighlin 1745–1761
Thomas Carter (died 1835), British politician and Member of Parliament for Tamworth
Thomas Carter (TD) (1882–1951), Irish Sinn Féin/Cumann na nGaedhael/Fianna Fáil politician
Thomas Carter (New Zealand politician) (1827–1900), third superintendent of Marlborough Province
Thomas Carter (Virginia politician) (1731–1803), Virginia delegate, grandson of Thomas Carter of Barford plantation
Thomas H. Carter (1854–1911), American politician, Montana

Religion
 Thomas Carter (minister) (1608–1684), English-born American Puritan minister
 Thomas Carter (Dean of Tuam) (fl. early 19th century), Irish Anglican priest
 Thomas Thellusson Carter (1808–1901), English Protestant clergyman

Sports
 Thomas Nevile Carter (1851–1879), English footballer
 Thomas Carter (wrestler) (born 1974), American professional wrestler known as Reckless Youth

Other
 Thomas Carter (writer) (died 1867), British Army clerk and military writer
 Thomas Henry Carter (soldier) (1831–1908), American army officer
 Thomas Carter (ornithologist) (1863–1931), English ornithologist active in Australia
 Thomas Francis Carter (1882–1925), American scholar who wrote about the origins of printing in China
 Thomas S. Carter (born 1921), American engineer, president of Kansas City Southern Railway
 Thomas L. Carter, commercial pilot and major general in the Air Force Reserve Command
 Thomas Carter of the Carter Brothers, partner of the California railroad car manufacturing firm

See also
Tom Carter (disambiguation)